The F. W. Woolworth Company Store Renton is a commercial building in Renton, Washington. Built in 1954, it was listed in the National Register of Historic Places in 2015 for its direct association with growth and development of downtown Renton, and for its connection to the national five-and dime chain store, F.W. Woolworth Company. The building is now a Western Wear store.

History 

The Woolworth Company was one of the original pioneers of the five-and-dime store. The Woolworth Store in Renton was the first store in the Northwest to feature a 100% self-service business model. At its opening, which coincided with the F. W. Woolworth Company's diamond jubilee, the open shopping area on the first floor was 6000 sf. An employee lounge, conference room, and offices were on the second floor. The company closed the store between 1973 and 1974.  

The Woolworth Store in Renton was a two-story building that was combined with an adjacent one-story building in 1975. 

King County's historic preservation program awarded the restored building the John D. Spellman Award for historic preservation in 2016.

References

		
National Register of Historic Places in King County, Washington
Commercial buildings completed in 1954
F. W. Woolworth Company buildings and structures
Buildings and structures in Renton, Washington
International style architecture in Washington (state)
1954 establishments in Washington (state)